Sharof Rashidov District (until 2016: Jizzakh District) is a district of Jizzakh Region in Uzbekistan. The capital lies at the town Uchtepa.

The district consists of 7 urban-type settlements (Uchtepa, Gandumtosh, Qorayantoq, Qangʻli, Toqchiliq, Mulkanlik, Jizzaxlik) and 12 rural communities.

References

Districts of Uzbekistan
Jizzakh Region